Kremlevo is a rural locality (a village) in Tarnogskoye Rural Settlement, Tarnogsky District, Vologda Oblast, Russia. The population was 40 as of 2002. There are 3 streets.

Geography 
Kremlevo is located 4 km northeast of Tarnogsky Gorodok (the district's administrative centre) by road. Rylkovskaya is the nearest rural locality.

References 

Rural localities in Tarnogsky District
Kadnikovsky Uyezd